Limburg mijn Vaderland ("Limburg my Fatherland") is the official anthem of the two provinces of Limburg, Netherlands Limburg and Belgian Limburg.

History 

The anthem was written by the schoolteacher Gerard Krekelberg in 1909. Tijssen also wrote the anthem of the city of Roermond, Oud en trouw Roermond.

The fact that Krekelberg's lyrics are in Dutch can be seen as surprising. It is all the more surprising that he put quite a lot of emphasis on Limburg being united, which was not the case at the time - and arguably still is not. The Limburgish language was - and still is - very much a unifying factor in a culturally diverse area. Around the time that Krekelberg wrote his poem, Dutch was of little importance in daily life in Limburg. Everything was done in Limburgish. In the 19th century this was even more the case. Newspapers were either in German or French. In various parts of Limburg, German was the language used in churches and schools. In Maastricht, a largely Francized city due to its historic ties with Liège, education, theatre and 'polite' conversation and correspondence were in French.

Lyrics 
The lyrics describe the natural beauty of Limburg and the noble nature of its people. Usually only the first stanza is sung, sometimes also the second one. The third stanza talks about the "beautiful language of the ancestors", "despising foreign pomp" and "preferring our own way of life". The last stanza, about the strong ties with the Netherlands and the House of Orange, is for obvious reasons never sung in Belgium.

References 

Commercium songs
Limburg (region)
Limburgian culture
Regional songs
Belgian anthems
Dutch anthems
Dutch-language Belgian songs
European anthems
Music in Limburg (Netherlands)